Lundell is a Swedish surname. Notable people with the surname include:

Anton Lundell (born 2001), Finnish ice hockey player
Arvid Lundell (1899-1984), Canadian politician
Cyrus Longworth Lundell, American botanist
Einar Lundell, Swedish ice hockey player
Frida Lundell, Swedish missionary
Johan August Lundell, Swedish linguist
Karl Gustav Johanson Lundell, Russian silversmith
Ove Lundell, Swedish 500cc World Champion motocross racer
Per Lundell, Swedish ice hockey player
Ricky Lundell, American Gracie Jiu-Jitsu wrestler
Ulf Lundell, Swedish writer, poet, songwriter, composer, musician and artist

See also
Lundell Settlement, the result of a class action taken against Dell Computers

Swedish-language surnames